Arctomia teretiuscula is a rare species of squamulose (scaly) lichen in the family Arctomiaceae. It is found at high elevations in the mountains between Tibet and Sichuan, China.

Taxonomy
The lichen was formally described as a new species in 2005 by Norwegian lichenologist Per Magnus Jørgensen. Because of its small size and nondescript colour, it is readily missed in the field. Although at the time of publication the lichen was only known to occur at the type location, Jørgensen speculates that it may have a wider distribution in similar habitats in the Himalayas.

Description
Its thallus is coral-like in form and has a multilayer cortex with a compact layer of cyanobionts. Its ascospores, which number 8 per ascus, are spindle-shaped (fusiform) and often curved, divided by 6 to 8 septa, and measure 40–60 by 4–5 μm. No secondary chemicals were detected with the use of thin-layer chromatography, and all of the standard chemical spot tests are negative.

Arctomia teretiuscula is similar in appearance to Arctomia delicatula—the type species of genus Arctomia—found in western and northern Europe. The main visible difference between the two is the coralloid thallus of A. teretiuscula compared to the granular thallus of its European counterpart; other anatomical differences between the two become apparent when their internal microscopic structures are compared.

References

Baeomycetales
Lichen species
Lichens described in 2003
Lichens of China
Taxa named by Per Magnus Jørgensen